Steven Sanfield (born August 3, 1937 – January 28, 2015) was an American poet, children's book author, and Freedom Rider. He published over 30 books during his lifetime. The University of California Davis library holds a collection of his writings.

Biography
He earned a BA from the University of Massachusetts, Amherst.

He took part in the Los Angeles to Houston Freedom Ride.

Bibliography

Poetry
 Wandering (1977)
 The Confounding (1980)
 Chasing the Cranes with Dale Pendell (1986)
 American Zen: by a guy who tried it (1994)
 No Other Business Here: a Haiku Correspondence with John Brandi (1999)
 The Rain Begins Below: Selected Slightly Longer Poems 1961-2005 (2005)
 The Right Place: 77 at 77 (2014)
 Clouds Come and Go (2015)

Children's books
 Adventures of High John the Conqueror (1988)
 Snow (1995)
 Bit by Bit (1995)
 The Great Turtle Drive (1996), illustrated by Dirk Zimmer
 Just Rewards (1996), illustrated by Emily Lisker

References

External links
 Haiku by Steve Sanfield

1937 births
2015 deaths
English-language haiku poets
American male writers
Freedom Riders
University of Massachusetts Amherst alumni